The Beiseker Mansion in Fessenden, North Dakota was listed on the National Register of Historic Places in 1977.  The listing included two contributing buildings.

History
Beiseker Mansion was built in 1899. Built for Thomas Lincoln Beiseker, it has also been known as T. L. Beiseker Mansion and as Order of the Eastern Star (O.E.S.) Home. It includes Single Style and Queen Anne architecture.  Beiseker Mansion was "described at the time of its construction as one of the finest houses in North Dakota (Wells County Free Press, July 27, 1899) [and it] has survived since then with its original architectural character remarkably intact."

Thomas Lincoln Beiseker (1866-1941) was a banker and land speculator. He was the founder of the land companies Beiseker & Davidson Ltd., and the Calgary Colonization Company. Thomas Beiseker was the namesake of Beiseker, Alberta .

References

Houses on the National Register of Historic Places in North Dakota
Queen Anne architecture in North Dakota
Shingle Style architecture in North Dakota
Houses completed in 1899
Houses in Wells County, North Dakota
National Register of Historic Places in Wells County, North Dakota
Shingle Style houses
1899 establishments in North Dakota